Nova Herculis 2021, also known V1674 Herculis, was a nova in the constellation Hercules. It reached a peak brightness of magnitude 6.0, making it visible to the naked eye under ideal observing conditions. It was discovered on June 12, 2021, by Seiji Ueda of Kushiro Japan, just hours before it obtained peak brightness. The discovery images were taken with a Canon EOS 6D digital camera with a 200 mm lens, when the nova was at magnitude 8.4. Subsequent analysis of ASAS-SN data showed the star had a magnitude of 16.62 (g band) 8.4 hours before it was discovered. Of the galactic novae for which detailed light curves are available, Nova Herculis 2021 had the fastest decline from peak brightness ever seen. This nova has been detected throughout the electromagnetic spectrum, from radio to gamma rays.

All novae are binary stars, consisting of a white dwarf orbited by a mass-losing "donor star".  Photometric observations taken during June, July and August 2021 found that binary pair's orbital period is 3.670416 ± 0.0008 hours. The Zwicky Transient Facility had been observing the region of the sky containing Nova Herculis 2021 since March 2018, and analysis of that data yielded a spin period of 8.357 minutes for the white dwarf.

References

External links 

 

Novae
Hercules (constellation)
2021 in science
Herculis, V1674
20210612